Germany debuted in the Junior Eurovision Song Contest 2020 which was held on 29 November 2020 in Warsaw, Poland. German broadcasters ARD and ZDF selected Suzan Oseloff to represent the country with the song "Stronger With You" through the televised selection process . She finished in 12th position (last place) with 66 points.

Before Junior Eurovision

Dein Song für Warschau 
On 8 July 2020, KiKA confirmed that a delegation from broadcasters NDR and ZDF will participate for the first time in the 2020 contest in Warsaw. For the nation's first participation, the broadcasters selected their artist through the national selection process , with the song selected internally.

KiKa opened the application window for the national selection show on 8 July until 31 July for children of age 9 to 14. Of the 70 applicants, five finalists were selected: Davit, Susan, Leroy, Linnea and Malaika. The finalists each performed two original songs by Levent Geiger: "See You Later" and "Stronger with You". The jury members of the show, who decided the winner, were Max Mutzke, Levent Geiger, Michelle Huesmann, and Martin Haas. The show aired on 1 and 2 September, and on the second day Susan was revealed as the winner with the song "Stronger with You".

Artist and song information

Susan 

Susan Oseloff (born 30 November 2006), better known as Susan, is a German singer, who represented Germany in the Junior Eurovision Song Contest 2020.

Stronger with You 

"Stronger with You" is a song by German singer Susan. It represented Germany at the Junior Eurovision Song Contest 2020. The verses of the song are in German, while the chorus is in English.

At Junior Eurovision
During the opening ceremony and the running order draw, which both took place on 23 November 2020, Germany was drawn to perform first on 29 November 2020, preceding Kazakhstan.

Voting

Detailed voting results

References 

Germany
Junior
Junior Eurovision Song Contest